The inauguration of Ramon Magsaysay as the seventh president of the Philippines took place on December 30, 1953, at the Independence Grandstand in Manila. The inauguration marked the commencement of the three-year term of Ramon Magsaysay as president and of Carlos P. Garcia as Vice President. The oath of office was administered by Chief Justice of the Supreme Court of the Philippines Ricardo Paras.

1953 in the Philippines
Presidency of Ramon Magsaysay
Magsaysay, Ramon